Pompertuzat is a commune in the Haute-Garonne department in southwestern France.

Population

Its residents are called Pompertuziens in French.

Geography
Municipality of the urban area of Toulouse in its urban center located in Lauragais on the Canal du Midi, at 15 km in the south of Toulouse.

Administration

Sights

 Church of the 16th century
 Dovecote of the 18th century
 Bridge of the 17th century on the Canal du Midi (called "bridge of Deyme", "Pont de Deyme" in French). This bridge, built of red brick in the development of the Canal du Midi, April 12, 1814 destroyed by the troops of Marshal Soult at retirement before they make the Anglo-Spanish in Wellington, after the indecisive battle of Toulouse the day before. The bridge was then rebuilt in 1821. This bridge with barrel vault typical of the late seventeenth century is included in the inventory of historical monuments.

Personalities
 Jane Dieulafoy (née Magre), born June 29, 1851 and died May 25, 1916, in particular, brought with her husband Marcel Dieulafoy several Persian friezes that are exhibited at the Louvre (frieze of Lions and frieze of archers in particular), and produces a literary consistent, inspired by the many trips she made with her husband
 Marcel-Auguste Dieulafoy himself, an archaeologist, husband of the former, who was also mayor of the village.

See also
Communes of the Haute-Garonne department

References

External links

Official site

Communes of Haute-Garonne